58097 Alimov, provisional designation , is a background asteroid and relatively slow rotator from the central region of the asteroid belt, approximately 4 kilometers in diameter.

The asteroid was discovered on 26 October 1976, by Russian astronomer Tamara Smirnova at the Crimean Astrophysical Observatory in Nauchnyj, on the Crimean peninsula. It was later named after Russian ecologist Alexandr Alimov.

Orbit and classification 

Alimov is a non-family from the main belt's background population. It orbits the Sun in the central asteroid belt at a distance of 1.9–3.2 AU once every 4 years and 1 month (1,502 days). Its orbit has an eccentricity of 0.26 and an inclination of 13° with respect to the ecliptic.

The asteroid's observation arc begins just 4 days prior to its official discovery observation, with a precovery taken at the Japanese Kiso Observatory on 22 October 1976.

Physical characteristics

Lightcurves 

In October 2013, a rotational lightcurve of Alimov was obtained from photometric observations made by astronomers at the Palomar Transient Factory in California. It gave a relatively long rotation period of  hours with a brightness variation of 0.26 magnitude.

Diameter and albedo 

According to the survey carried out by the NEOWISE mission of NASA's space-based Wide-field Infrared Survey Explorer, Alimov measures 3.9 and 4.0 kilometers in diameter and its surface has an albedo of 0.136 and 0.152, respectively. The Collaborative Asteroid Lightcurve Link assumes a standard albedo for stony asteroids of 0.20 and calculates a diameter of 3.7 kilometers with an absolute magnitude of 14.54.

Naming 

This minor planet was named after Russian ecologist Alexandr Fyodorovich Alimov (born 1933), president of the Hydrobiological Society and founder of the Russian School of Functional Ecology.

Alimov is known for his theoretical and experimental work on aquatic ecosystems and for the study on the prevention of ecological crisis. The official naming citation was published by the Minor Planet Center on 6 March 2004. (Alexandr Fyodorovich Alimov should not be confused with Aleksandr Fyodorovich Akimov, who worked at Chernobyl during the nuclear accident).

References

External links 
 Asteroid Lightcurve Database (LCDB), query form (info )
 Dictionary of Minor Planet Names, Google books
 Asteroids and comets rotation curves, CdR – Observatoire de Genève, Raoul Behrend
 Discovery Circumstances: Numbered Minor Planets (55001)-(60000) – Minor Planet Center
 
 

058097
Discoveries by Tamara Mikhaylovna Smirnova
Named minor planets
19761026